Kieran Darcy-Smith is an Australian actor, film director, and screenwriter. He is best known for starring in the films The Cave, The Square, Animal Kingdom, and The Reef. He made his feature film directing debut with 2012 film Wish You Were Here, and his second directorial project The Duel was released in June 2016.

Career

Directing and writing 
In 2012, Smith made his writing and directing debut with a feature mystery film Wish You Were Here, starring Felicity Price, Joel Edgerton, and Teresa Palmer.

Smith has also directed another feature, a western film The Duel starring Liam Hemsworth, Woody Harrelson, Emory Cohen, William Hurt, and Alice Braga. The film will be released in a limited release and through video on demand on 24 June 2016, by Lionsgate Premiere.

Filmography

As actor 
 The Cave (2005)
 Dangerous (2007)
 The Square (2008)
 Animal Kingdom (2010)
 The Reef (2010)

As director / writer 
 Wish You Were Here (2012) - Director / writer
 The Duel (2016) - Director
 Wolf Creek (2017) S2 E3 - Director
 Reef Break (2019) - Director

References

External links 
 

Living people
1965 births
Australian male film actors
Australian male television actors
20th-century Australian male actors
21st-century Australian male actors
Australian film directors
Australian screenwriters